is a former Japanese football player and manager. He played for Japan national team. He used his name "黒崎 比差支" from 1992 to 1999.

Club career
Kurosaki was born in Kanuma on May 8, 1968. After graduating from high school, he joined Honda in 1987. In 1992, he moved to J1 League club Kashima Antlers. In 1996, the club won J1 League. In 1997, the club also won J.League Cup and Emperor's Cup. In 1998, he moved to Kyoto Purple Sanga. In 2000s, he played at Vissel Kobe (2000), Albirex Niigata (2001) and Omiya Ardija (2002–03). He retired in 2003.

National team career
On May 5, 1989, Kurosaki debuted for Japan national team against South Korea. He also played at 1990 World Cup qualification and 1990 Asian Games. In 1993, he was selected Japan for the first time in 3 years. He played 24 games and scored 4 goals for Japan until 1997.

Coaching career
After retirement, Kurosaki started coaching career at Kashima Antlers in 2004. He moved to Albirex Niigata in 2007 and became a manager in 2010. He was sacked in May 2012. In 2013, he signed with Omiya Ardija and became a coach. In May 2017, he was sacked with manager Hiroki Shibuya.

Club statistics

National team statistics

Managerial statistics

Honors

Teams
J1 League: 1996
Emperor's Cup: 1997
J.League Cup: 1997
Japanese Super Cup: 1997

Individual
Dynasty Cup Top scorers: 1995

References

External links
 
 Japan National Football Team Database
 
 

1968 births
Living people
Association football people from Tochigi Prefecture
Japanese footballers
Japan international footballers
Japan Soccer League players
J1 League players
J2 League players
Honda FC players
Kashima Antlers players
Kyoto Sanga FC players
Vissel Kobe players
Albirex Niigata players
Omiya Ardija players
1988 AFC Asian Cup players
Japanese football managers
J1 League managers
Albirex Niigata managers
Footballers at the 1990 Asian Games
Association football forwards
Asian Games competitors for Japan
Shandong Taishan F.C. non-playing staff
Association football coaches